Patokino is a rural locality (a selo) in Filippenkovskoye Rural Settlement, Buturlinovsky District, Voronezh Oblast, Russia. The population was 280 as of 2010. There are 4 streets.

Geography 
Patokino is located 16 km east of Buturlinovka (the district's administrative centre) by road. Yelizavetino is the nearest rural locality.

References 

Rural localities in Buturlinovsky District